The following is a list of Africa Magic Viewers Choice Awards ceremonies. The award has always been held at Exhibition Center, Eko Hotel and Suites, Lagos State since the first edition.

Ceremonies

External links 
 Official website

Award ceremonies
Lists of award ceremonies